Infamous Angel is the debut studio album of American country music singer-songwriter Iris DeMent. It was released by Philo Records in 1992. The liner notes were written by John Prine, to whom DeMent's music has been compared by Los Angeles Times critic Robert Hilburn.

In 1995, her song "Our Town" was played in the closing moments of the last episode for the CBS TV series Northern Exposure. It has also been recorded by Kate Rusby and by Jody Stecher and Kate Brislin.

The Transatlantic Sessions version of "Let the Mystery Be" became the theme song for the second season and series finale of The Leftovers.

Track listing
All songs by Iris DeMent except as indicated.

"Let the Mystery Be" – 2:46
"These Hills" – 3:40
"Hotter Than Mojave in My Heart" – 2:33
"When Love Was Young" – 3:38
"Our Town" – 4:58
"Fifty Miles of Elbow Room" (Rev F.W. McGee) – 3:12
"Infamous Angel" – 3:46
"Sweet Forgiveness" – 2:44
"After You've Gone" – 4:04
"Mama's Opry" – 3:25
"Higher Ground" (listed as "Traditional" in the liner notes but in fact by Johnson Oatman, Jr. (lyrics) and Charles H. Gabriel (music)) – 3:34

Personnel
Iris DeMent – lead and harmony vocals, guitar
Additional musicians 
Jeff Black – harmony vocals (11)
Flora Mae DeMent – lead vocals (11)
Jerry Douglas – Dobro (7)
Stuart Duncan – fiddle, mandolin
Emmylou Harris – harmony vocals, guitar (10)
Mark Howard – guitar
Jeff Hushkins – bass
Roy Huskey, Jr. – bass
Hal Ketchum – harmony vocals (11)
Al Perkins – Dobro (1–6, 8–11)
Jim Rooney – producer, harmony vocals (6, 11)
Pete Wasner – piano
Technical
Richard Adler – recording and mixing engineer
Kelley McRae - cover photography

Charts

References

1992 debut albums
Iris DeMent albums
Warner Records albums
Philo Records (folk) albums